Troll bait may refer to:

In fishing:
The bait used in trolling, a fishing method where baited fishing lines are drawn through water.

In internet slang:
A flame bait, a provocative or offensive message meant to provoke an argument or an angry response

See also
Troll (disambiguation)